Sadinja Vas pri Dvoru is a village in the Municipality of Žužemberk in southeastern Slovenia. It lies on the left bank of the Krka River just off the regional road from Žužemberk to Dvor. The area is part of the historical region of Lower Carniola. The municipality is now included in the Southeast Slovenia Statistical Region.

Name
The name of the settlement was changed from Sadinja vas to Sadinja vas pri Dvoru in 1955.

References

External links
Sadinja Vas pri Dvoru at Geopedia

Populated places in the Municipality of Žužemberk